The Slender Man is a fictional supernatural character.

Slender Man or Slenderman may also refer to:

 Slender Man (film), a 2018 American horror film
 Slender Man stabbing, a 2014 stabbing incident in Wisconsin, USA
 Beware the Slenderman, a 2016 American documentary about the stabbing
 Slender Man, an online personality on radio station WOZZ in Wisconsin, USA
 "Slender Man", a track on the 2015 album 2PM of 2PM by South Korean boy band 2PM
 Slenderman and Other Strange Tales, a 2016 EP by American band Haunted Garage